Steinkjerelva is a  long river in the town of Steinkjer in Steinkjer municipality in Trøndelag county, Norway. It forms at the confluence between the rivers Byaelva and Ogna at Guldbergaunet and flows through the town of Steinkjer before flowing into Beitstadfjorden, the inner part of the Trondheimsfjord. The river is crossed by four bridges, including one for the Nordland Line and the Sneppen Bridge which is part of the European route E6 highway.

See also
List of rivers in Norway

References

Steinkjer
Rivers of Trøndelag
Rivers of Norway